Kavresthali is a small town in Tarakeshwor Municipality Kathmandu District in the Bagmati Zone of central Nepal. At the time of the 2011 Nepal census it had a population of 4,774 and had 1,007 houses.

Kavresthali is in the northern side of Kathmandu valley and is 3 km (ward office located at 5.5 km.) away from ring road. It lies in the lap of Shivapuri National Park.

Schools
Kavresthali Secondary School
Green Hills Academy
Kalidevi Secondary School
Milan Dharmasthali
Gyanoda Basic School
Padma Chakra School

References

Populated places in Kathmandu District